Elizabeth Gunn may refer to:

Elizabeth Gunn (author), American crime and thriller writer
Elizabeth Gunn (paediatrician) (1879–1963), founder of New Zealand's Children's Health Camps movement
Liz Gunn, New Zealand former television host and conspiracy theorist